"Live the Life" is a 2002 song and debut single by Fundisha Johnson and features Jermaine Dupri. Co-written by Johnson and Dupri, Billboard called the song an "inspirational ditty about the ups and downs of life" with "a feel-good sound that is awfully catchy."

The song was first featured on the soundtrack to the film, Hardball, and then on her album, Lessons, for So So Def/Columbia Records.

References

2002 singles
2002 songs
Songs written for films
Songs written by Jermaine Dupri
Song recordings produced by Jermaine Dupri